Mokrice may refer to several places:

 Mokrice, Bosnia and Herzegovina, a village near Bosanska Gradiška
 Mokrice, Croatia, a village near Oroslavje
 Mokrice Castle in Slovenia
 Gornje Mokrice, a village near Petrinja, Croatia